Barbaros: Sword of the Mediterranean is a Turkish historical drama television series created by ES Film, starring Engin Altan Düzyatan and Ulaş Tuna Astepe in the lead roles. The series depicts the lives of Oruc Reis and Hizir Reis, two consecutive "Kapudan Pasha" of the Ottoman Empire. Barbaros: Sword of the Mediterranean premiered on 16 September 2021 on TRT 1.

Premise
The series details the life of Oruc Reis, Hizir Reis and their brothers.

Episodes
<onlyinclude>

Cast

Main cast

Supporting cast

Baba Oruç Levents

Minor cast

Guest characters

Production

Development
The series is written by Cüneyt Aysan, Ozan Aksungur and Oğuz Ayaz. The series is being filmed in Istanbul. It began shooting in the last weeks of March 2021.

Casting
Casting of actors is still ongoing. It was initially confirmed that Çağatay Ulusoy would be a member of the cast, and would have the lead role, although he later announced his departure from the show due to delay in production. Engin Altan Düzyatan announced that he was taking part in the series after he had been caught outside a gym, he replied to the media that he was training hard for the new Barbaros series.

Release 
By July 2021, the series was expected to be released in September of that year. The first teaser trailer for the series was released on 20 June 2021. On 4 September, TRT released a second trailer for the series, revealing its title, Barbaroslar: Akdeniz'in Kılıcı, and premiere date of 16 September.

See also
List of Islam-related films
Barbaros Hayreddin Paşa (film)

References

External links

  Barbaroslar Season 1

2021 Turkish television series debuts
Television series about Islam
Television series about the Ottoman Empire
Turkish television series
Turkish Radio and Television Corporation original programming
Turkish historical television series
Television series set in the 16th century